Fighting Spirit Unleashed (2020) was a two-week professional wrestling event promoted by New Japan Pro-Wrestling (NJPW). The two events took place from September 4 to 11, 2020 at the Oceanview Pavilion in Port Hueneme, California. The event was promoted as part of New Japan Pro-Wrestling of America's weekly TV show, NJPW Strong.

Storylines
Fighting Spirit Unleashed featured professional wrestling matches on each show that involved different wrestlers from pre-existing scripted feuds and storylines. Wrestlers portray villains, heroes, or less distinguishable characters in the scripted events that build tension and culminate in a wrestling match or series of matches.

Results

References

Notes

External links
Official New Japan Pro-Wrestling website

New Japan Pro-Wrestling shows
2020 in professional wrestling
September 2020 events in the United States
Professional wrestling in California
Events in California
2020 in California